Lauterbacher Tropfen is a bitters that is manufactured and bottled in the Ore Mountain village of Lauterbach in the borough of  Marienberg. The bitters is known for its aromatic taste and dark green colour. The recipe is a company secret. According to the company the spirit is unsweetened.

The bitters contains 40% alcohol by volume. It is best drunk chilled. The herbal extract is produced by maceration and distillation.

The firm was founded in 1899 and is still run by the same family.

Literature 
 Günter Baldauf: Der Schmiedfritzaugust - ein erzgebirgisches Original aus Lauterbach. In: Erzgebirgische Heimatblätter. 19. Jahrgang, Heft 1/1997, pp. 21–22, 
 Manfred Blechschmidt: Das erzgebirgische Kräuterbuch. Altis, Friedrichsthal, 1998, .
 Birgit Bobach: Profile aus dem Mittleren Erzgebirge. Band 1. Schäfer, Limbach-Oberfrohna, 2000, .
 Helga Kaden, Heinz Kaden: Phantasten, Käuze, Wunderheiler. Das Buch der erzgebirgischen Originale. Altis, Friedrichsthal, 2003, .
 Mächtige Erleichterung. In: Der Spiegel. No. 8, 1994, pp. 105b–107 (online).

References

External links 
Homepage of the manufacturer

Marienberg
German liqueurs
German brands